Presumption of paternity in paternity law and common law is the legal determination that a man is "presumed to be" a child's biological father without additional supportive evidence, usually as a result of marriage.

Generally associated with marriage, 
 
a presumption of paternity can also be made by court order, contact over time with a child, or simple cohabitation with the mother. 

If there is no presumption of paternity, a process such as recognition may be used to establish paternity.

See also

 Presumption of legitimacy
 Recognition (family law)

References

Family law
Paternity